The 1976–77 Idaho Vandals men's basketball team represented the University of Idaho during the 1976–77 NCAA Division I men's basketball season. Members of the Big Sky Conference, the Vandals were led by third-year head coach Jim Jarvis and played their home games on campus at the Kibbie Dome in Moscow, Idaho. They were 5–21 overall and 3–11 in conference play.

No Vandals were named to the all-conference team; senior guard James Smith, Idaho's leading scorer, was honorable mention.

References

External links
Sports Reference – Idaho Vandals: 1976–77 basketball season
Gem of the Mountains: 1977 University of Idaho yearbook – 1976–77 basketball season
Idaho Argonaut – student newspaper – 1977 editions

Idaho Vandals men's basketball seasons
Idaho
Idaho
Idaho